Robert Forman  (born 1948), known as Rab Forman, is a Scottish solicitor and politician. He was the Chairman of the Scottish Conservative and Unionist Party between June 2015 and May 2022 and prior to that appointment served as Honorary Secretary of the party for ten years.

Rab Forman was born in Edinburgh and graduated from Royal High School and the University of Edinburgh. He was elected as a Councillor for the former Lothian Regional Council in 1990. He served the Merchiston and Morningside ward for four years. He was a senior partner at Blackadders LLP, where he practised as a private client solicitor.

Forman is a Writer to The Signet and was appointed a Member of The Most Excellent Order of the British Empire in the 2015 Queen's Birthday honours list. He is the honorary president of his former school, Royal High School. He is a former Moderator of the Society of High Constables of Edinburgh. He is also the former captain of Mortonhall Golf Club.

References

1948 births
Living people
Scottish Conservative Party councillors
Members of the Order of the British Empire
Alumni of the University of Edinburgh
Politicians from Edinburgh
Scottish solicitors